

Lords of the Manor of Standish 

Members of the Standish family who were Lords of the Manor of Standish in Lancashire, are listed below.

Other family members 

Radulphus de Stanedis

See also 
 Myles Standish
 Frederick Standish
 Standish, Greater Manchester
 Standish Hall
 Berystede
 Hélène Standish

External links 

 The House of Standish -The french connection on Myles Standish.info website
 Standish Papers on The National Archives website

References 

Surnames
Families of French ancestry
Standish, Greater Manchester